Scott Thunes (pronounced "TOO-nis") (born January 20, 1960) is a bass player, formerly with Frank Zappa, Wayne Kramer, Steve Vai, Andy Prieboy, Mike Keneally, Fear, The Waterboys, Big Bang Beat, and others.

Thunes was raised in San Anselmo, California.

He played with Zappa's band from 1981 to 1988, and plays on such albums as The Man From Utopia, Them or Us, Broadway the Hard Way, You Can't Do That on Stage Anymore, Does Humor Belong In Music?, The Best Band You Never Heard In Your Life, Frank Zappa Meets the Mothers of Prevention, Ship Arriving Too Late to Save a Drowning Witch, Make a Jazz Noise Here, and Guitar, a double-album compilation of Zappa's live guitar solos.

His most prominent bass performance can be heard on Frank Zappa's Valley Girl, which peaked at #32 on the Billboard Hot 100.

He played bass on Frank Zappa's Jazz from Hell, which won a Grammy Award for Best Rock Instrumental Performance in 1988.

More recently, he is touring on bass as part of ongoing The Zappa Band tribute group, made up of ex-Zappa band alumni Ray White (lead vocals, guitar), Mike Keneally (guitar, keys, vocals), Robert 'Bobby' Martin (keyboards, sax, vocals), and Zappa Plays Zappa alums Jamie Kime (guitar) and ZAPPA archivist Joe “Vaultmeister” Travers (drums, vocals). Many of the 2021 TZB performances were opening for King Crimson.

References

External links
 
 Interview 
 Scott Thunes with the San Francisco Free Jazz Collective

Living people
American punk rock bass guitarists
American male bass guitarists
Fear (band) members
The Waterboys members
1960 births
People from San Anselmo, California
Guitarists from Los Angeles
20th-century American guitarists
Zappa Plays Zappa members